During the 1921–22 Scottish football season, Celtic competed in the Scottish First Division.

Results

Scottish First Division

Scottish Cup

See also
Lord Provost's Rent Relief Cup

References

Scottish football championship-winning seasons
Celtic F.C. seasons
Celtic